Kankrej is one of the 182 Legislative Assembly constituencies of Gujarat state in India. It is part of Banaskantha district. It is numbered as 15-Kankrej.

List of segments
This assembly seat represents the following segments,

 Kankrej Taluka
 Deesa Taluka (Part) Villages – Lunpur, Manekpura, Khardosan, Aseda, Nava, Sadarpur, Chhatrala, Mudetha, Yavarganj, Bodal, Jhabadiya, Bhadramali, Dharisana, Kanajhara, Samau Motavas, Saviyana, Velavapura, Samau Nana as.

Members of Legislative Assembly
1967 - Jayantilal Virchand Shah, Indian National Congress
1972 - Shantilal Dhandhara, Indian National Congress
1975 - Mafatlal Panchani, Indian National Congress (O)
1980 - Shantilal Dhandhara, Indian National Congress
1985 - Jayantilal Virchand Shah, Janata Party
1990 - Dharshibhai Khanpura, Janata Dal
1995 - Dharshibhai Khanpura, Indian National Congress
1998 - Magansinh Vaghela, Indian National Congress
2002 - Dharshibhai Khanpura, Indian National Congress
2007 - Babubhai Desai, Bharatiya Janata Party
2012 - Dharshibhai Khanpura, Indian National Congress

Election results

2022

2017

2012

See also
 List of constituencies of the Gujarat Legislative Assembly
 Banaskantha district

References

External links
 

Assembly constituencies of Gujarat
Politics of Banaskantha district